How Wikipedia Works is a 2008 book by Phoebe Ayers, Charles Matthews, and Ben Yates. Published by No Starch Press, it is a how-to reference book for using and contributing to the Wikipedia encyclopedia, targeted at "students, professors, and everyday experts and fans". It offers specific sections for teachers, users, and researchers. It was designed as a reference work and has detailed bibliographies for each section.

Publication
How Wikipedia Works (and How You Can Be a Part of It) is published by No Starch Press as part of their series of technical how-to books.

The book was originally published under the GNU Free Documentation License. At the time of publication, Wikipedia was also released under the GFDL. The book has since been re-licensed under the CC BY-SA, which Wikipedia now uses.

Reception
The Register (UK) called it "a great one-stop source for information of the world’s go-to source for information." David Weeks of MyMac.com called it a "fine reference guide" and praised its comprehensive content, but mildly criticized the book's length. He recommended that readers start by skimming through the book and consult it later for more detailed guidance when editing.

See also
 Bibliography of Wikipedia
 Wikipedia: The Missing Manual

References

External links

 Website
 Reviews of the book, No Starch Press
 How Wikipedia Works (pdf), Internet Archive

2008 non-fiction books
Books about Wikipedia
Creative Commons-licensed books
Handbooks and manuals
No Starch Press books